Penn State York is a commonwealth campus of Pennsylvania State University located in Spring Garden Township, Pennsylvania. It enrolls 742 students as of 2021.

The York campus was established in 1939 to provide technical education and to allow students to complete basic degree requirements in their home area before transferring to University Park to finish their program. In 1953, the school began to offer its first complete associate degree programs. It moved to its present location in 1956.  Today, it remains a suburban commuter-campus and occupies .

Athletics
Penn State–York teams participate as a member of the United States Collegiate Athletic Association (USCAA). The Nittany Lions are a member of the Pennsylvania State University Athletic Conference (PSUAC). Men's sports include baseball, basketball and soccer; while women's sports include basketball, volleyball, and softball.  Golf, for men and women, was recently added.

References

External links 
 Official website

Educational institutions established in 1939
Pennsylvania State University colleges
York, Pennsylvania
Universities and colleges in York County, Pennsylvania
USCAA member institutions
1939 establishments in Pennsylvania
York